Melvin Jerome Blanc (born Blank ; May 30, 1908July 10, 1989) was an American voice actor and radio personality whose career spanned over 60 years. During the Golden Age of Radio, he provided character voices and vocal sound effects for comedy radio programs, including those of Jack Benny, Abbott and Costello, Burns and Allen, The Great Gildersleeve,  Judy Canova, and his own short-lived sitcom. 

However, he became known worldwide for his work in the Golden Age of American Animation as the voices of Bugs Bunny, Daffy Duck, Porky Pig, Tweety, Sylvester, Yosemite Sam, Foghorn Leghorn, the Tasmanian Devil, and numerous other characters from the Looney Tunes and Merrie Melodies theatrical cartoons. He later voiced characters for Hanna-Barbera's television cartoons, including Barney Rubble and Dino on The Flintstones, Mr. Spacely on The Jetsons, Secret Squirrel on The Atom Ant/Secret Squirrel Show, the title character of Speed Buggy, and Captain Caveman on Captain Caveman and the Teen Angels and The Flintstone Kids.

Referred to as "The Man of a Thousand Voices", he is regarded as one of the most influential people in the voice acting industry, and as one of the greatest voice actors of all time.

Early life

Blanc was born on May 30, 1908 in San Francisco, California, to Eva (née Katz), a Lithuanian Jewish immigrant, and Frederick Blank (born in New York to German Jewish parents), the younger of two children. He grew up in San Francisco's Western Addition neighborhood, and later in Portland, Oregon, where he attended Lincoln High School. He had an early fondness for voices and dialect, which he began practicing at the age of 10. He claimed that he changed the spelling of his name when he was 16, from Blank to Blanc, because a teacher told him that he would amount to nothing and be like his name, a "blank". He joined the Order of DeMolay as a young man, and was eventually inducted into its Hall of Fame. After graduating from high school in 1927, he divided his time between leading an orchestra, becoming the youngest conductor in the country at the age of 19; and performing shtick in vaudeville shows around Washington, Oregon and northern California.

Career

Radio work
Blanc began his radio career at the age of 19 in 1927, when he made his acting debut on the KGW program The Hoot Owls, where his ability to provide voices for multiple characters first attracted attention. He moved to Los Angeles in 1932, where he met Estelle Rosenbaum (1909–2003), whom he married a year later, before returning to Portland. He moved to KEX in 1933 to produce and co-host his Cobweb and Nuts show with his wife Estelle, which debuted on June 15. The program played Monday through Saturday from 11:00 pm to midnight, and by the time the show ended two years later, it appeared from 10:30 pm to 11:00 pm.With his wife's encouragement, Blanc returned to Los Angeles and joined Warner Bros.–owned KFWB in Hollywood in 1935. He joined The Johnny Murray Show, but the following year switched to CBS Radio and The Joe Penner Show.

Blanc was a regular on the NBC Red Network show The Jack Benny Program in various roles, including voicing Benny's Maxwell automobile (in desperate need of a tune-up), violin teacher Professor LeBlanc, Polly the Parrot, Benny's pet polar bear Carmichael and the train announcer. The first role came from a mishap when the recording of the automobile's sounds failed to play on cue, prompting Blanc to take the microphone and improvise the sounds himself. The audience reacted so positively that Benny decided to dispense with the recording altogether and have Blanc continue in that role. One of Blanc's characters from Benny's radio (and later TV) programs was "Sy, the Little Mexican", who spoke one word at a time. He continued to work with Benny on radio until the series ended in 1955 and followed the program into television from Benny's 1950 debut episode through guest spots on NBC specials in the 1970s.

Radio Daily magazine wrote in 1942 that Blanc "specialize[d] in over fifty-seven voices, dialects, and intricate sound effects", and by 1946, he was appearing on over fifteen programs in various supporting roles. His success on The Jack Benny Program led to his own radio show on the CBS Radio Network, The Mel Blanc Show, which ran from September 3, 1946, to June 24, 1947. Blanc played himself as the hapless owner of a fix-it shop, as well as his young cousin Zookie. Blanc also appeared on such other national radio programs as The Abbott and Costello Show, the Happy Postman on Burns and Allen, and as August Moon on Point Sublime. During World War II, he appeared as Private Sad Sack on various radio shows, including G.I. Journal. Blanc recorded a song titled "Big Bear Lake".

Animation voice work during the golden age of Hollywood

In December 1936, Mel Blanc joined Leon Schlesinger Productions, which was producing theatrical cartoon shorts for Warner Bros. After sound man Treg Brown was put in charge of cartoon voices, and Carl Stalling became music director, Brown introduced Blanc to animation directors Tex Avery, Bob Clampett, Friz Freleng, and Frank Tashlin, who loved his voices. The first cartoon Blanc worked on was Picador Porky (1937) as the voice of a drunken bull. He soon after received his first starring role when he replaced Joe Dougherty as Porky Pig's voice in Porky's Duck Hunt, which marked the debut of Daffy Duck, also voiced by Blanc.

Following this, Blanc became a very prominent vocal artist for Warner Bros., voicing a wide variety of the "Looney Tunes" characters. Bugs Bunny, as whom Blanc made his debut in A Wild Hare (1940), was known for eating carrots frequently (especially while saying his catchphrase "Eh, what's up, doc?"). To follow this sound with the animated voice, Blanc would bite into a carrot and then quickly spit into a spittoon. One often-repeated story is that Blanc was allergic to carrots, which Blanc denied.

In Disney's Pinocchio, Blanc was hired to perform the voice of Gideon the Cat. However, it was eventually decided to have Gideon be a mute character (similar to Dopey from Snow White and the Seven Dwarfs), so all of Blanc's recorded dialogue was deleted except for a solitary hiccup, which was heard three times in the finished film.

Blanc also originated the voice and laugh of Woody Woodpecker for the theatrical cartoons produced by Walter Lantz for Universal Pictures, but stopped voicing Woody after the character's first three shorts when he was signed to an exclusive contract with Warner Bros. Despite this, his laugh was still used in the Woody Woodpecker cartoons until 1951, when Grace Stafford recorded a softer version, while his "Guess who!?" signature line was used in the opening titles until the end of the series and closure of Walter Lantz Productions in 1972.

During World War II, Blanc served as the voice of the hapless Private Snafu in a series of shorts produced by Warner Bros. as a way of training recruited soldiers through the medium of animation.

Throughout his career, Blanc, aware of his talents, protected the rights to his voice characterizations contractually and legally. He, and later his estate, never hesitated to take civil action when those rights were violated. Voice actors at the time rarely received screen credits, but Blanc was an exception; by 1944, his contract with Warner Bros. stipulated a credit reading "Voice characterization(s) by Mel Blanc". According to his autobiography, Blanc asked for and received this screen credit from studio boss Leon Schlesinger after he was denied a salary raise. Initially, Blanc's screen credit was limited only to cartoons in which he voiced Bugs Bunny. This changed in March 1945 when the contract was amended to also include a screen credit for cartoons featuring Porky Pig and/or Daffy Duck. This however, excluded any shorts with the two characters made before that amendment occurred, even if they released after the fact (Book Revue and Baby Bottleneck are both examples of this). By the end of 1946, Blanc began receiving a screen credit in any subsequent Warner Bros. cartoon for which he provided voices.

Voice work for Hanna-Barbera and others
In 1960, after the expiration of his exclusive contract with Warner Bros., Blanc continued working for them, but also began providing voices for the TV cartoons produced by Hanna-Barbera; his roles during this time included Barney Rubble of The Flintstones and Cosmo Spacely of The Jetsons. His other voice roles for Hanna-Barbera included Dino the Dinosaur, Secret Squirrel, Speed Buggy, and Captain Caveman, as well as voices for Wally Gator and The Perils of Penelope Pitstop.

Blanc also worked with former "Looney Tunes" director Chuck Jones, who by this time was directing shorts with his own company Sib Tower 12 (later MGM Animation/Visual Arts), doing vocal effects for the Tom and Jerry series from 1963 to 1967. Blanc was the first voice of Toucan Sam in Froot Loops commercials.

Blanc reprised some of his Warner Bros. characters when the studio contracted him to make new theatrical cartoons in the mid- to late 1960s. For these, Blanc voiced Daffy Duck and Speedy Gonzales, the characters who received the most frequent use in these shorts (later, newly introduced characters such as Cool Cat and Merlin the Magic Mouse were voiced by Larry Storch). Blanc also continued to voice the "Looney Tunes" for the bridging sequences of The Bugs Bunny Show, as well as in numerous animated advertisements and several compilation features, such as The Bugs Bunny/Road Runner Movie (1979). He also voiced Granny on Peter Pan Records in 4 More Adventures of Bugs Bunny (1974) and Holly-Daze (1974), in place of June Foray, and replaced the late Arthur Q. Bryan as Elmer Fudd's voice during the post-golden age era.

Car accident and aftermath
On January 24, 1961, Blanc was driving alone when his sports car was involved in a head-on collision on Sunset Boulevard; his legs and his pelvis were fractured as a result. About two weeks later, one of Blanc's neurologists at the UCLA Medical Center tried a different approach than just trying to address the unconscious Blanc himself: address his characters. Blanc was asked, "How are you feeling today, Bugs Bunny?" After a slight pause, Blanc answered, in a weak voice, "Eh… just fine, Doc. How are you?" The doctor then asked Tweety if he was there, too. "I tawt I taw a puddy tat", was the reply. Blanc returned home on March 17. Four days later, Blanc filed a US $500,000 lawsuit against the City of Los Angeles. His accident, one of 26 in the preceding two years at the intersection known as Dead Man's Curve, resulted in the city funding the restructuring of curves at the location.

Years later, Blanc revealed that during his recovery, his son Noel "ghosted" several Warner Bros. cartoons' voice tracks for him. Warner Bros. had also asked Stan Freberg to provide the voice for Bugs Bunny, but Freberg declined, out of respect for Blanc. At the time of the accident, Blanc was also serving as the voice of Barney Rubble in The Flintstones. His absence from the show was relatively brief; Daws Butler provided the voice of Barney for a few episodes, after which the show's producers set up recording equipment in Blanc's hospital room and later at his home to allow him to work from there. Some of the recordings were made while he was in full-body cast as he lay flat on his back with the other Flintstones co-stars gathered around him. He returned to The Jack Benny Program to film the program's 1961 Christmas show, moving around by crutches and a wheelchair.

Later years
In the 1970s, Blanc gave a series of college lectures across the US and appeared in commercials for American Express. Mel's production company, Blanc Communications Corporation, collaborated on a special with the Boston-based Shriners' Burns Institute called Ounce of Prevention, which became a 30-minute TV special.

Throughout the late 1970s and 1980s, Blanc performed his "Looney Tunes" characters for bridging sequences in various compilation films of Golden Age-era Warner Bros. cartoons, such as The Bugs Bunny/Road Runner Movie, The Looney Looney Looney Bugs Bunny Movie, Bugs Bunny's 3rd Movie: 1001 Rabbit Tales, Daffy Duck's Fantastic Island, and Daffy Duck's Quackbusters. His final performance of his "Looney Tunes" roles was in Bugs Bunny's Wild World of Sports (1989). After spending most of two seasons voicing the diminutive robot Twiki in Buck Rogers in the 25th Century, Blanc's last original character was Heathcliff from 1980 to 1988.

In the live-action film Strange Brew (1983), Blanc voiced the father of Bob and Doug MacKenzie, at the request of comedian Rick Moranis. In the live-action/animated movie Who Framed Roger Rabbit (1988), Blanc reprised several of his roles from Warner Bros. cartoons (Bugs, Daffy, Porky, Tweety, and Sylvester), but left Yosemite Sam to Joe Alaskey (who later became one of Blanc's regular replacements until his death in 2016). The film was one of the few Disney projects in which Blanc was involved. Blanc died just a year after the film's release. His final recording session was for Jetsons: The Movie (1990).

On January 29, 1962, Mel and his son Noel formed Blanc Communications Corporation, a media company which produced over 5000 public service announcements and commercials, which remains in operation. Mel and Noel appeared with many stars, including Kirk Douglas, Lucille Ball, Vincent Price, Phyllis Diller, Liberace, and The Who.

Personal life
Blanc and his wife Estelle Rosenbaum were married on January 4, 1933, and remained married until his death in 1989. Their son, Noel Blanc, was also a voice actor.

Death

Blanc began smoking cigarettes when he was 9 years old. He continued his pack-a-day habit until age 77, after he was diagnosed with emphysema. On May 19, 1989, his family checked him into Cedars-Sinai Medical Center in Los Angeles when they noticed he had a bad cough while shooting a commercial. He was originally expected to recover, but when his health worsened, doctors discovered he had advanced coronary artery disease. After nearly two months in the hospital, Blanc died on July 10, 1989 at Cedars-Sinai of complications from both illnesses. He was 81. He is interred in Hollywood Forever Cemetery section 13, Pinewood section, plot #149 in Hollywood. His will specified that his gravestone read ""—the phrase with which Blanc's character, Porky Pig, concluded Warner Bros. cartoons.

Legacy
Blanc is regarded as the most prolific voice actor in entertainment history. He was the first voice actor to receive on-screen credit.

His death was considered a significant loss to the cartoon industry because of his skill, expressive range, and the sheer number of the continuing characters he portrayed, whose roles were subsequently assumed by several other voice talents. As film critic Leonard Maltin observed, "It is astounding to realize that Tweety Bird and Yosemite Sam are the same man!"

Blanc said that Sylvester the Cat was the easiest character for him to voice, because "[he's] just my normal speaking voice with a spray at the end"; and that Yosemite Sam was the hardest, because of his loudness and raspyness.

A doctor who examined Blanc's throat found that he possessed unusually thick, powerful vocal cords that gave him an exceptional range, and compared them to those of opera singer Enrico Caruso.

After his death, Blanc's voice continued to be heard in newly released productions, such as recordings of Dino the Dinosaur in the live-action films The Flintstones (1994) and The Flintstones in Viva Rock Vegas (2000). Similarly, recordings of Blanc as Jack Benny's Maxwell were featured in Looney Tunes: Back in Action (2003). More recently, archive recordings of Blanc have been featured in new computer-generated imagery-animated "Looney Tunes" theatrical shorts; I Tawt I Taw a Puddy Tat (shown with Happy Feet Two) and Daffy's Rhapsody (shown with Journey 2: The Mysterious Island).

For his contributions to the radio industry, Blanc has a star on the Hollywood Walk of Fame at 6385 Hollywood Boulevard. His character Bugs Bunny was also awarded a star on the Hollywood Walk of Fame on December 10, 1985.

Blanc trained his son Noel in the field of voice characterization. Noel performed his father's characters (particularly Porky Pig) on some programs, but did not become a full-time voice artist. Warner Bros. expressed reluctance to have a single voice actor succeed Blanc, and employed multiple new voice actors to fill the roles in the 1990s, including Noel Blanc, Jeff Bergman, Joe Alaskey and Greg Burson.

Filmography

Radio

Film

Television

Video games

Live-action

Discography
Yah, Das Ist Ein Christmas Tree and I Tan't Wait Til Quithmuth Day (Capitol, 1950, Album CAS-3191) 
Clink, Clink, Another Drink (Bluebird, 1942) as Drunk
Bugs Bunny Stories for Children (Capitol, 1947) as Bugs Bunny, Daffy Duck, Porky Pig, additional voices
The Woody Woodpecker Song (Capitol, 1948) as Woody Woodpecker
Bugs Bunny and the Tortoise (Capitol, 1948) as Bugs Bunny, Cecil Turtle, Daffy Duck, Henery Hawk, additional voices
That's All Folks! (Capitol, 1948) as Porky Pig
Won't You Ever Get Together With Me (Capitol, 1948) as Tweety, Sylvester
Bugs Bunny in Storyland (Capitol, 1949) as Bugs Bunny, Daffy Duck, Porky Pig, Beaky Buzzard, Old King Cole, Fiddlers Three, Mary's Lamb, Bo Peep's Sheep, Big Bad Wolf
Woody Woodpecker and His Talent Show (Capitol, 1949) as Woody Woodpecker, Stanley Squirrel, Billy Goat, Plato Platypus, Fido, Happy Hedgehog, Harry Humbug
Bugs Bunny Sings with Daffy Duck, Tweety Pie, Yosemite Sam, Sylvester (Capitol, 1950) as Bugs Bunny, Daffy Duck, Yosemite Sam, Tweety, Sylvester
Bugs Bunny Meets Hiawatha (Capitol, 1950) as Bugs Bunny
Daffy Duck Meets Yosemite Sam (Capitol, 1950) as Daffy Duck, Yosemite Sam
Tweety Pie (Capitol, 1950) as Tweety, Sylvester
Woody Woodpecker's Picnic (Capitol, 1951) as Woody Woodpecker, Tommy Turtle, English Bulldog, German Shepherd, Irish Setter, Scotty
Henery Hawk (Capitol, 1951) as Henery Hawk, Foghorn Leghorn, Daffy Duck
Tweety's Puddy Tat Twouble (Capitol, 1951) as Tweety, Sylvester
Tweet, Tweet, Tweety (Capitol, 1952) as Tweety, Sylvester
Bugs Bunny and the Grow-Small Juice (Capitol, 1952) as Bugs Bunny, Daffy Duck
Henery Hawk's Chicken Hunt (Capitol, 1952) as Henery Hawk, Foghorn Leghorn, additional voices
Bugs Bunny and Aladdin's Lamp (Capitol, 1952) as Bugs Bunny, Genie
Woody Woodpecker and the Scarecrow (Capitol, 1952) as Woody Woodpecker, additional voices
Daffy Duck's Feathered Friend (Capitol, 1952) as Daffy Duck
Sylvester and Hippety Hopper (Capitol, 1952) as Sylvester, Sylvester Jr., additional voices
Woody Woodpecker and the Animal Crackers (Capitol, 1953) as Woody Woodpecker, additional voices
Woody Woodpecker and the Lost Monkey (Capitol, 1953) as Woody Woodpecker, additional voices
Bugs Bunny and Rabbit Seasoning (Capitol, 1953) as Bugs Bunny
Snowbound Tweety (Capitol, 1953) as Tweety, Sylvester
Woody Woodpecker and His Spaceship (Capitol, 1953) as Woody Woodpecker, additional voices
Wild West Henery Hawk (Capitol, 1953) as Henery Hawk, Foghorn Leghorn, additional voices
Pied Piper Pussycat (Capitol, 1953) as Sylvester, additional voices
Daffy Duck's Duck Inn (Capitol, 1954) as Daffy Duck, Dog
Bugs Bunny and the Pirate (Capitol, 1954) as Bugs Bunny, Yosemite Sam
Woody Woodpecker and the Truth Tonic (Capitol, 1954) as Woody Woodpecker, additional voices
Tweety's Good Deed (Capitol, 1954) as Tweety, Sylvester, additional voices
Woody Woodpecker's Fairy Godmother (Capitol, 1955) as Woody Woodpecker, additional voices
Woody Woodpecker in Mixed-Up Land (Capitol, 1955) as Woody Woodpecker, additional voices
Woody Woodpecker Meets Davy Crockett (Capitol, 1955) as Woody Woodpecker, additional voices
Woody Woodpecker's Family Album (Decca, 1957) as Pepito, Sailor, Malamute, Andy Panda, Fluten Bluten, Heinie the Hyena, Homer Pigeon, Cuckoo, Oswald the Lucky Rabbit
Bugs Bunny Songfest (Golden, 1961) as Bugs Bunny, Sylvester, Tweety, Daffy Duck, Porky Pig, Henery Hawk, Pepé Le Pew, Speedy Gonzales, Hippety Hopper, Foghorn Leghorn, Cicero Pig
Speedy Gonzales (Dot, 1962) as Speedy Gonzales
Magilla Gorilla and His Pals (Golden, 1964) as Droop-A-Long
The Flintstones: Flip Fables (Hanna-Barbera, 1965) as Barney Rubble, Chubby, Tubby, Stubby, Landlord, Beowolfe
The Flintstones: Hansel and Gretel (Hanna-Barbera, 1965) as Barney Rubble, Hansel, Gretel, Strudelmeyer, Fang, Witch, Reporter
Treasure Island Starring Sinbad, Jr. (Hanna-Barbera, 1965) as Salty
Secret Squirrel and Morocco Mole in: Super Spy (Hanna-Barbera, 1965) as Secret Squirrel, Tyrone
The New Alice in Wonderland or What's a Nice Kid Like You Doing in a Place Like This? (Hanna-Barbera, 1966) as Barney Rubble, March Hare, Prosecuting Attorney/King's Son
The Flintstones Meet the Orchestra Family (Sunset, 1968) as Barney Rubble
The New Adventures of Bugs Bunny (Peter Pan, 1973) as Bugs Bunny, Daffy Duck, Porky Pig, Elmer Fudd, Petunia Pig, Speedy Gonzales, Pablo, Wile E. Coyote, Road Runner, additional voices
Four More Adventures of Bugs Bunny (Peter Pan, 1974) as Bugs Bunny, Porky Pig, Petunia Pig, Tweety, Sylvester, Granny, additional voices
Holly Daze (Peter Pan, 1974) as Bugs Bunny, Porky Pig, Speedy Gonzales, Daffy Duck, Elmer Fudd, Granny, Yosemite Sam, Foghorn Leghorn, Sylvester, Junior, Santa Claus, Narrator, Radio Announcer
Looney Tunes Learn About Numbers (Warner Audio Publishing, 1986) as Bugs Bunny, Elmer Fudd, Yosemite Sam, additional voices
Looney Tunes Learn About The Alphabet (Warner Audio Publishing, 1986) as Bugs Bunny, Daffy Duck, Yosemite Sam, additional voices
Looney Tunes Learn About Going To School (Warner Audio Publishing, 1986) as Bugs Bunny, Sylvester, Sylvester Jr., Tweety, additional voices
Looney Tunes Learn About Sing-Along Songs (Warner Audio Publishing, 1986) as Bugs Bunny, Daffy Duck, Porky Pig, Tweety, Sylvester, Elmer Fudd, Yosemite Sam, additional voices
Looney Tunes Learn About Colors (Warner Audio Publishing, 1986) as Bugs Bunny, Porky Pig, additional voices
Looney Tunes Learn About Shapes and Sizes (Warner Audio Publishing, 1986) as Bugs Bunny, Cecil Turtle, Daffy Duck, Porky Pig, additional voices

References

Bibliography
 That's Not All, Folks!, 1988 by Mel Blanc, Philip Bashe. Warner Books,  (Softcover),  (Hardcover)
 Terrace, Vincent. Radio Programs, 1924–1984. Jefferson, NC: McFarland, 1999.

External links

 
 
 
 
 Toonopedia article about Mel Blanc
 40 MP3 downloads of The Mel Blanc Show
 The Mel Blanc Show on Outlaws Old Time Radio

1908 births
1989 deaths
20th-century American male actors
American Freemasons
American male radio actors
American male television actors
American male voice actors
American people of German-Jewish descent
American people of Lithuanian-Jewish descent
American people of Russian-Jewish descent
Articles containing video clips
Burials at Hollywood Forever Cemetery
Deaths from emphysema
Hanna-Barbera people
Deaths from coronary artery disease
Inkpot Award winners
Jewish American male actors
Jews and Judaism in Portland, Oregon
Lincoln High School (Portland, Oregon) alumni
Looney Tunes
Male actors from Los Angeles
Male actors from Portland, Oregon
Male actors from San Francisco
Metro-Goldwyn-Mayer cartoon studio people
Walter Lantz Productions people
Warner Bros. Cartoons voice actors
MGM Animation/Visual Arts
Respiratory disease deaths in California
United Service Organizations entertainers
Animal impersonators
Capitol Records artists